Dongfanghong Subdistrict is a subdistrict of Yuelu District in Changsha, Hunan, China. It is historically the territory of state-owned Dongfanghong Farm. The subdistrict has three villages and a community under its jurisdiction.

History
In 2006, the villages of Jinnan and Hualong of Huangjin Township, Heyeba Village of Leifeng Town were transferred to the town of Dongfanghong, Yuelu District from Wangcheng County. The town of Dongfanghong was amalgamated to Lugu Subdistrict on November 19, 2015. On March 1, 2017, the subdistrict of Dongfanghong was reformed from a community and three villages of Lugu Subdistrict.

Subdivisions
The subdistrict of Dongfanghong was formed from Lugu Subdistrict on March 1, 2017. It has a community (Jianshanhu / ) and three villages -Heyeba, Hualong and Jinnan - under its jurisdiction.

References

Subdistricts of Changsha
Yuelu District